Waiting for the End to Come is the eleventh studio album by Canadian death metal band Kataklysm.

Track listing

Release
Album was released on October 25, 2013 in European Union. In the United Kingdom it was released on October 28, 2013 and in the United States – on October 29, 2013.

Credits

Personnel
 Maurizio Iacono – vocals
 Jean-François Dagenais – guitar
 Stephane Barbe – bass guitar
 Oli Beaudoin – drums

Production
 Zeuss – mixing, mastering
 Mircea Gabriel Eftemie – layout

Notes
In the music video for The American Way, Maurizio is seen playing bass while JF and Stephane both play guitar.

References

2013 albums
Kataklysm albums
Nuclear Blast albums
Albums with cover art by Eliran Kantor